Sheikh Maktoum bin Mohammed bin Rashid Al Maktoum (born 24 November 1983) is the Minister of Finance of the United Arab Emirates, Deputy Ruler of Dubai and Chairman of Dubai Media Incorporated. He was named as deputy ruler in February 2008 when his elder brother Hamdan was made crown prince. He served as deputy ruler alongside his uncle Sheikh Hamdan bin Rashid Al Maktoum until the latter's death in March 2021. Since then, he has been the sole deputy ruler under his father Mohammed bin Rashid Al Maktoum's reign. In September 2021, he was appointed Deputy Prime Minister and Finance Minister of the UAE.

Maktoum bin Mohammed bin Rashid Al Maktoum is also the Chairman of Dubai Knowledge Park, formerly known as Dubai Knowledge Village, inaugurated in 2003.

Early life and education
Maktoum was born on 24 November 1983 in Dubai. He is the third son of Dubai's ruler, Sheikh Mohammed bin Rashid Al Maktoum with his wife Sheikha Hind bint Maktoum bin Juma Al Maktoum. While he is his mother's third son, he is his father's tenth child and fourth son. He completed his high school at Rashid School for Boys, Dubai, and graduated from the American University in Dubai with a bachelor's degree in Business Administration in 2005. He attended numerous training courses in the Dubai School of Government, as well as Harvard University.

Career
Sheikh Maktoum chairs the Board of Directors of Dubai Media Incorporated and serves as the Chairman of Dubai Technology and Media Free Zone Authority (TECOM Investments). Sheikh Maktoum has accompanied the President of the United Arab Emirates, Sheikh Khalifa bin Zayed Al Nahyan, to numerous conferences, summits and official visits. He has also accompanied Sheikh Mohammed to several Gulf, Arab and international political and economic conferences.

He is chairman of the higher board of governors of the Dubai International Financial Centre.

Appointments 
In 2017, he was appointed as Chairman of the Dubai Real Estate Corporation.

In May 2018, he was sworn in as President of the Financial Audit Authority (FAA).

On 15 May 2021, he was appointed as Chairman of the Ruler's Court.

In 2021, Mohammed bin Rashid Al Maktoum, the ruler of Dubai, assigned Maktoum bin Mohammed bin Rashid Al Maktoum to supervise the financial markets and stock exchanges in Dubai. In November 2021, Maktoum bin Mohammed listed Dubai's road toll system Salik on the Dubai Financial Market.

In May 2021, he was appointed as Chairman of the Court of the Ruler of Dubai.

He was appointed Chairman of the Dubai Culture and Arts Authority (DCAA) in 2015. The DCAA is also known as Dubai Culture and is tasked with managing the heritage of Dubai.

Decisions as Minister of Finance 
In November 2021, Maktoum formed the Dubai Markets Supervisory Committee, which he chairs, to develop strategy and policy for the Dubai Financial Market.

Also in November 2021, he launched the Future District Fund, worth AED 1 billion, to invest in technology start-ups and incentivizing technology companies to list in the Dubai Financial Market. The Fund's set target was to establish 1,000 companies within five years of its setup. Maktoum appointed Sharif El-Badawi as CEO of the Future District Fund.

In October 2021, Maktoum bin Mohammed bin Rashid Al Maktoum, along with his father and three brothers, launched the Hatta Master Development Plan to develop the Hatta region as a business and tourism hub.

Personal life
On 15 May 2019, he married Maryam bint Butti bin Maktoum Al Maktoum, on the same day that his brothers Hamdan and Ahmad also married. On 6 June 2019, he and his brothers celebrated the royal wedding together at the Dubai World Trade Center. Together with his wife, he has three daughters: 
Hind bint Maktoum Al Maktoum (born 24 November 2020). 
Latifa bint Maktoum Al Maktoum (born 11 January 2022). 
Shaikha bint Maktoum Al Maktoum (born 25 January 2023).

Award 
The Sheikh Maktoum bin Mohammed bin Rashid Al Maktoum Cambridge ICT Awards recognize outstanding academic achievements among students in the UAE based on Cambridge IGCSE, AS Level and A Level examinations. The awards also honor inspirational teachers.

References

External links

Official Website of Maktoum bin Mohammed Al Maktoum 

1983 births
Maktoum family
Emirati princes
American University in Dubai alumni
Deputy Prime Ministers of the United Arab Emirates
Finance ministers of the United Arab Emirates
Mohammed bin Rashid School of Government alumni
People from Dubai
Living people
Sons of monarchs